Adam Wilk (born 21 November 1997) is a Polish professional footballer who plays as a goalkeeper for II liga side Hutnik Kraków, on loan from Cracovia.

Club career
Wilk was born in Kraków and started his career at Cracovia. In February 2017, he joined Legionovia Legionowo on loan until the end of the season, and made 14 league appearances for the club. On 15 July 2017, Wilk made his debut for Cracovia in a 1–1 draw at home to Piast Gliwice, before going on to make a further 10 appearances that season. In August 2018, Wilk joined Ruch Chorzów on loan, before returning to Cracovia in January 2019, having made just one appearance for the club.

In June 2019, he signed a contract with the club lasting until the summer of 2021.

On 23 December 2022, having not made a single appearance for Cracovia's senior team since his return from Ruch, he was loaned until the end of the season to third division side Hutnik Kraków beginning on 1 January 2023.

International career
Wilk appeared once for the Poland national under-20 football team in 2018.

References

External links
 
 
 

1997 births
Living people
Footballers from Kraków
Polish footballers
Poland youth international footballers
Association football goalkeepers
MKS Cracovia (football) players
Legionovia Legionowo players
Ruch Chorzów players
Hutnik Nowa Huta players
Ekstraklasa players
II liga players
III liga players